X–Ray is a ballet made by New York City Ballet balletmaster in chief Peter Martins to John Adams' 1994 Violin Concerto, commissioned jointly by the Minnesota Orchestra and City Ballet. The ballet premiere took place Tuesday, November 22, 1994, at the New York State Theater, Lincoln Center; since June 1995 it has been performed as the third movement of Martins' Adams Violin Concerto ballet.

Original cast 

   
Darci Kistler 
Nikolaj Hübbe
 
Wendy Whelan
Nilas Martins

Reviews 

  
NY Times review by Anna Kisselgoff, November 24, 1994 

NY Times review by Anna Kisselgoff, February 26, 1995 

Ballets by Peter Martins
New York City Ballet repertory
1994 ballet premieres
Ballets to the music of John Adams (composer)